James Lyon, 7th Earl of Strathmore (circa 1702 – 1735) was a Scottish peer and freemason.

He was the son of John Lyon, 4th Earl of Strathmore and Kinghorne and Lady Elizabeth Stanhope.
He was christened on 24 December 1702. He succeeded as Earl of Strathmore following the stabbing of Charles Lyon, 6th Earl of Strathmore and Kinghorne in a drunken altercation in 1728. On 6 March 1731 he married Mary Oliphant, daughter of Charles Oliphant (brother of William Oliphant, 11th Lord Oliphant). He died without issue on 4 January 1735 at Edinburgh, Scotland.

He was succeeded as earl by his younger brother, Thomas Lyon, 8th Earl of Strathmore and Kinghorne.

Ancestry

References

thePeerage.com. Retrieved 16 August 2008
thePeerage.com. Retrieved 28 May 2009
Charles Whitlock Moore, The Freemasons' Monthly Magazine, 1845, p. 265

1700s births
1735 deaths
7
James
Freemasons of the Premier Grand Lodge of England
Grand Masters of the Premier Grand Lodge of England